Your Weapon is the second album by the American punk rock band Legal Weapon, independently released in 1982 on Arsenal Records.

Critical reception
Trouser Press wrote: "While not quite as consistent [as the debut], it has basically the same sound as its predecessor, but with meatier production and a solid, fulltime rhythm section." Maximumrocknroll called the album a "workmanlike collection of slow- to mid-tempo punk rock numbers made more enjoyable by fine female lead vocals."

Track listing
All songs written by Legal Weapon.

Personnel
Legal Weapon
Frank Agnew – guitar
Kat Arthur – vocals
Brian Hansen – guitar, vocals
Adam Maples – drums, vocals
Eddie Wayne – bass guitar, vocals

Additional musicians and production
Pat Burnette – production, engineering
Ed Colver – photography
Curb E. (Charlene) Hassencahl – illustrations
Dan Vargas – production

References

1982 albums
Legal Weapon albums
Triple X Records albums